Johann Daniel Wilhelm Hartmann (12 January 1793 – 18 April 1862) was a Swiss painter, engraver and malacologist.

Biography
He was born in St. Gallen, the son of Georg Leonhard Hartmann (1764-1828), who was also a painter. After training in fine arts with his father in Zurich, Munich and Bern, he worked in St. Gallen from 1826 as a naturalist and miniature painter, heraldist and genealogist.

Taxa described by Hartmann include Discus ruderatus, Ampullaceana ampla, Trochulus clandestinus, Bythiospeum acicula, Papillifera and others.

Works
Hartmann, J. D. W. 1821. System der Erd- und Süsswasser-Gasteropoden Europa's: in besonderer Hinsicht auf diejenigen Gattungen, welche in Deutschland und der Schweitz angetroffen werden. Nürnberg, Jacob Sturm, 1821
Hartmann, J. D. W. 1844. Erd- und Süsswasser-Gasteropoden der Schweiz. Mit Zugabe einiger merkwürdigen exotischen Arten. I. Band. - pp. i-xx [= 1-20], 1–227, Tab. I-XII [= 1-12], I-XII [sic, = 13-24], 25–84. St. Gallen. (Scheitlin & Zollikofer).Archive

References

Sources

B. B. Woodward, 1906: On the dates of publication of J. D. Wilhelm Hartmann's "Erd- und Süsswasser-Gastropoden", St. Gallen, 1840. Proceedings of the Malacological Society of London 7, 1906
D. Heppell,1966: The dates of publication of J. D. W. Hartmann's "Erd- und Süsswasser-Gasteropoden". Journal of Conchology 26, 1966 84–88

1793 births
1862 deaths
19th-century engravers
19th-century Swiss painters
19th-century Swiss zoologists
Swiss engravers
Swiss malacologists
Swiss male painters
19th-century Swiss male artists